Friend Husband is a 1918 American silent comedy drama directed by Clarence G. Badger and starring Madge Kennedy and Rockliffe Fellowes. It was released by Goldwyn Pictures and features a plot about a will requiring that the heir be married.

Plot
As described in a film magazine, Dorothy Dean (Kennedy), a young woman opposed to marriage, is shocked to find that under the terms of a wealthy aunt's will she is compelled to wed in order to inherit the estate. She advertises for a man who will go through the marriage ceremony and become her husband for a consideration and then leave her. Her lawyer has difficulty in obtaining a suitable young man when Dorothy mistakes Don Morton (Fellowes), a law student working in the office, for an applicant and a wedding is arranged. Don falls in love with the willful miss and kidnaps her. Leaving her at a cabin on an island, he returns to the mainland. The cabin is the rendezvous of thieves, and when Don discovers that the gang is going back to the shack he swims the river, rescues Dorothy after a hard fight with the gang and turns them over to the police. Dorothy then accepts her "husband friend" as her real husband.

Cast

Reception
Like many American films of the time, Friend Husband was subject to restrictions and cuts by city and state film censorship boards. For example, the Chicago Board of Censors required cuts, in Reel 3, of a woman turning down the bedclothes on a twin bed, Reel 4, six scenes of a holdup of an automobile, Reel 5, thieves examining loot, and a highwayman shooting a man.

References

External links

Film still at silentfilmstillarchive.com

1918 films
American silent feature films
American black-and-white films
1910s English-language films
1918 comedy-drama films
1910s American films
Silent American comedy-drama films